Monas verden (eng. Mona's World) is a Danish film from 2001, directed by Jonas Elmer.

The actors could work relatively freely of a script by Nikolaj Peyk. The story was first created by Jonas Elmer with Sidse Babett Knudsen, and given to the actors (12-13 pages). A test filming of the improvisation took place, and was then made into the script by Nikolaj Peyk.

Jonas Elmer also had the idea of creating a website where everybody could write suggestions for the film, such as the actor's lines, the locations, the poster, taglines, logos, and the plot of the film. The website (monasverden.tv2.dk) was put up in 2000.

Cast
Sidse Babett Knudsen - Mona
Thomas Bo Larsen - Thorbjørn
Mads Mikkelsen - Casper
Klaus Bondam - Don J
Jesper Asholt - Chefen
Bjarne Henriksen - Tommy
Bodil Udsen - Gudrun

Awards and nominations
2001 Special Prize in Memoriam R.W. Fassbinder, winner: Jonas Elmer, awarded at the Mannheim-Heidelberg International Filmfestival
2002 Robert Award nomination: Best Film - Monica Steenberg (producer) 
2002 Bodil Award nomination: Best Actress - Sidse Babett Knudsen

References

External links

 
Monas verden at the Danish Film Institute

2001 films
Danish comedy films
2000s Danish-language films
Films directed by Jonas Elmer (director)